Michael Mark Aloni (or Alony; ; born 31 January 1984) is an Israeli actor, director, writer and television presenter.

Early life
Aloni was born in Tel Aviv, to a secular Jewish family. His mother is an attorney and his father is an accountant. During his military service in the Israel Defense Forces, he served as a Gadna commander in the Marva training program of the Education Corps.

He studied acting at the Nissan Nativ Acting Studio between 2006–2009. He also appeared in a number of advertising campaigns as a male model.

Media career
He is known for starring in Shtisel, Out in the Dark and the 2017–2018 series, When Heroes Fly, produced by Keshet. In April 2018 it won the best series at Canneseries and has been commissioned for a second season. Aloni also hosts the popular reality TV show The Voice Israel. He was cast as Gabriel in The Beauty Queen of Jerusalem. In December 2022, it was announced that Aloni will play the lead character in a TV adaption of We Were the Lucky Ones, a  book of the same name by Georgia Hunter, which tells the true life story of the Kurc family in Poland who survived the Holocaust.

Filmography

References

External links 
 

Israeli male film actors
Israeli male television actors
Israeli television presenters
Israeli male models
Israeli male voice actors
Israeli Jews
Living people
1984 births
Male actors from Tel Aviv
21st-century Israeli male actors